Edward McGarry (July 5, 1817May 17, 1899) was an Irish American immigrant, house painter, and Democratic politician, and a pioneer settler of Milwaukee, Wisconsin.  He served as the 4th Wisconsin prison commissioner (at that time an elected position), and represented Milwaukee County for five years in the Wisconsin State Senate and State Assembly.

Background 
McGarry was born in County Down, Ireland, on July 5, 1817. He received what his official biography would describe vaguely as "a good education," and went into business in Liverpool as an inspector of cargo ships. He emigrated to the United States in 1841, coming to Milwaukee in 1847 where he worked with his brother in the housepainting business.

Legislative and other public service 
McGarry served as a member of the Assembly in 1850 and 1853 and spent two years (1854-1855) in the Senate representing the 6th Senate district as successor to fellow Democrat Duncan Reed.

He served a year as deputy warden of the state prison at Waupun, and was elected state prison commissioner, which was also warden of the State Prison (at that time a partisan elected position) in 1855 on the Democratic ticket, serving from January 7, 1856 to January 4, 1858 in that position. His Senate seat was taken by fellow Democrat Edward O'Neill.

He returned for a one-year Assembly term in 1864 from the 8th Milwaukee Assembly district (Wauwatosa and Greenfield), succeeding Edward Collins (also a native of Ireland). He was not re-elected, and was succeeded by John Weiler, who (like Collins and McGarry) was a Democrat.

Milwaukee County House of Correction 
Because of his experience gained in the prison he was called to organize the Milwaukee County House of Correction (he had been interested in getting the law passed that organized the institution, and was instrumental in framing the rules for its management) and served as its "Inspector" (chief jailer) for about a year and a half. He quoted Dr. Johnson as saying, "Knock a man down and reason with him afterwards."

Death 
He died May 17, 1899, in Milwaukee.

References 

1817 births
1899 deaths
Democratic Party members of the Wisconsin State Assembly
Politicians from County Down
People from Milwaukee County, Wisconsin
American prison wardens
Democratic Party Wisconsin state senators
19th-century American politicians
Irish emigrants to the United States (before 1923)
House painters